General Francisco Álvarez (also known as Puente Kyhá) is a town and district in the Canendiyú department of Paraguay. It is located about 500 km (310 mi) away from Asunción, the capital of the country, by Route Number 3.

Sources 
World Gazeteer: Paraguay – World-Gazetteer.com

Populated places in the Canindeyú Department